Asen Mitkov (born 17 February 2005) is a Bulgarian footballer who plays as a midfielder for Levski Sofia.

Career
Mitkov began playing football at the age of 6 with his hometown club Gigant Saedinenie. His talent was recognized and in 2016, he joined Botev Plovdiv's youth academy, one of the best in Bulgaria. He kept progressing and three years later, he moved to Levski Sofia. He signed his first professional contract with Levski on 25 February 2021. On 21 May 2021, Mitkov made his first-team debut, starting in a 2–1 away win against Cherno More.

Career statistics

Club

Honours

Club
Levski Sofia
 Bulgarian Cup (1): 2021–22

Notes

References

External links
 
 Profile at LevskiSofia.info
 Profile at Levski Academy

2005 births
Living people
Bulgarian footballers
Association football midfielders
PFC Levski Sofia players